Sandham: Symphony Meets Classical Tamil is a studio album in Tamil by American Composer Rajan Somasundaram that involved various international artists. It is based on Sangam period ancient Tamil poetry and the first ever music album on Sangam poetry. The Hindu music review called the album "A Major Event in the World of Music". As of 15 July 2020, the album got into Amazon's Top#10 best seller list under International Music category.

The album consists of seven songs, a collection of outstanding ancient Tamil Sangam literature poetry with music composed by Rajan Somasundaram and sung by leading singers Bombay Jayashri, Saindhavi, Karthik, Pragathi Guruprasad among others. The seven songs in the album are, Yathum Oore, written by Kaniyan Pungundranar having two versions (Symphony version and multi-genre version), Veral veli, written by Poet Kapilar, Yayum Nyayum written by Sempulapeyaneerar, Nyayiru Kayathu, written by Poet Kayamanar, Mullai Oorntha written by poet Okkur Masathiar and Kalamsei kove written by an unknown Sangam period poet. North Carolina based Durham Symphony led by Maestro William Henry Curry played the composition. Recordings happened in multiple locations across the world including Raleigh-Durham, Los Angeles, Chennai, Kyiv- Ukraine, Jerusalem, Beijing, Rome, London and Mumbai.

One of the songs from the album, "Yathum Oore Anthem", was declared the theme song of 10th World Tamil Conference. Composer Rajan mentioned that Yathum Oore being one of the oldest poem that talks about equality, unity and global citizenship, he composed the song to include 14 genres of musical styles including Indian classical, Western classical, rock, country, pop, calypso, Chinese and Japanese, reggae, rap, Middle Eastern, East Asian and Cuban.

Background
Poet, Philologist A. K. Ramanujan wrote that Tamil Sangam poetry is considered as a poetic achievement of Indian civilization. Written between 600BC-200AD, these poems are appreciated for their poetic value, vision, metaphors and technique. Though these poems are widely discussed in the academia as well as in popular media, there is no known musical form for Sangam poems. Composer Rajan mentioned that when he read a book titled Sanga Chithirangal by writer Jeyamohan, he fell in love with those poems and tried to find any known musical forms. When he found that there were no albums or singles on any of the sangam poems, he tried to compose the first ever album on sangam poetry.

About his unique style of music, he mentioned that he tried to bring in the best of three worlds- the melody of Indian classical music, Orchestration of western classical music and rhythms of tribal/ folk music.

Track listing

Album credits
 Rajan Somasundaram – Composer
 William Henry Curry – Conductor/ Arranger
 Bombay Jayashri – Singer
 Karthik – Singer
 Saindhavi – Singer
 Pragathi Guruprasad – Singer
 Priyanka – Singer
 Durham Symphony – Orchestra
 Kaniyan Pungundranar – Poet
 Kapilar – Poet
 Sempulapeyaneerar – Poet
 Okkur Masathiyar – Poet
 Kayamanar – Poet
 Steven Raets- Mixing & Mastering

References

2020 albums
Tamil music
Carnatic music